Lokomotyv Stadium is a name of several stadiums in Ukraine.

 Lokomotyv stadium (Chernihiv), a stadium in Chernihiv
 Lokomotyv Stadium (Poltava), a stadium in Poltava
 Lokomotyv Republican Sports Complex, a stadium in Simferopol
 Lokomotyv Stadium, a stadium in Korosten
 Lokomotyv Stadium, former name of Hirka Stadium in Ivano-Frankivsk
 Lokomotyv Stadium, former name of Tsentralnyi Stadion (Vinnytsia) in Vinnytsia

Sports venues in Ukraine